Ids Hylke Postma (born 28 December 1973) is a Dutch former speed skater. He is an Olympic gold medalist and former world champion.

In 1993 Postma finished 2nd at the Speedskating World Championships for Juniors. In his first year as senior skater, he became Dutch Allround Champion, finished second behind Johann Olav Koss at the World Allround Championships, and came 4th in the European Championships, but nevertheless did not qualify for the Dutch Olympic team. In 1997 Postma won both the European Allround Championships and the World Allround Championships.

His greatest success came in 1998 when he became World Allround Champion again, also setting a world record in the point-sum combination, and won two Olympic medals at the Olympic Games in Nagano. He won the 1,000 meters event and placed second at his specialty, the 1,500 meters, just behind Ådne Søndrål from Norway. Also in 1998, he was the first skater who skated an official world record on the 1,500 meters below 1:50.00: Postma did this in Berlin. Erben Wennemars had done the same the summer before, but that time was not ratified by the International Skating Union. Postma's record did not last long, because a few hours later Kevin Overland skated to a new record in Calgary.

Postma is also a three-time World Champion in the World Single Distance Championships. He won the 5,000 meters in 1996 and the 1,500 meters in 1999 and 2000.

In October 2004 Postma announced his retirement and nowadays he lives on his farm in Deersum. He married German speed skater Anni Friesinger on 11 August 2009 in Salzburg. The couple will not live together on the farm until renovations are complete. In August 2011, she gave birth to a daughter. He previously had a relationship with Renske Vellinga, until her death in a car crash in 1994.

Records

Personal records

Source: www.isu.org & SpeedskatingResults.com

World records

Source: SpeedSkatingStats.com

Tournament overview

DNQ = Did not qualify for the final distance
NC = No classification
source:

World Cup overview

– = Did not participate
* = 10000 meter
(b) = Division B

Medals won

References

External links
 Ids Postma at SpeedSkatingStats.com
 What's New at Q Sports?

1973 births
Living people
Dutch male speed skaters
Olympic speed skaters of the Netherlands
Speed skaters at the 1998 Winter Olympics
Speed skaters at the 2002 Winter Olympics
Olympic medalists in speed skating
World record setters in speed skating
People from Boarnsterhim
Sportspeople from Friesland
Medalists at the 1998 Winter Olympics
Olympic gold medalists for the Netherlands
Olympic silver medalists for the Netherlands
World Allround Speed Skating Championships medalists
World Single Distances Speed Skating Championships medalists
20th-century Dutch people
21st-century Dutch people